Dalmellington railway station served the town of Dalmellington, East Ayrshire, Scotland, from 1856 to 1964 on the Ayr and Dalmellington Railway.

History 
The station was opened on 7 August 1856 by the Glasgow and South Western Railway. On the west side was the goods yard, to the east was the locomotive shed and on the east side was the signal box, which opened in 1884. The station closed on 6 April 1964.

References 

Disused railway stations in East Ayrshire
Railway stations in Great Britain opened in 1856
Railway stations in Great Britain closed in 1964
Beeching closures in Scotland
Former Glasgow and South Western Railway stations
Dalmellington